The 1998 UCI Mountain Bike World Championships were held in Mont-Sainte-Anne, Quebec, Canada from 14 to 20 September 1998. The disciplines included were cross-country and downhill. The event was the 9th edition of the UCI Mountain Bike World Championships and the second to be held in Canada, following the 1992 World Championships in Bromont.

Medal summary

Men's events

Women's events

Medal table

References

See also
1998 UCI Mountain Bike World Cup

External links
 Results on uci.ch

UCI Mountain Bike World Championships
1998 UCI Mountain Bike World Championships
UCI Mountain Bike World Championships
Mountain biking events in Canada